Paul Edwards (born 25 December 1963) is an English former professional footballer who played as a left back. Active in the Football League between 1988 and 1996 for five different clubs, Edwards made over 200 career appearances.

Career
Born in Birkenhead, Edwards began his career in non-League football with Altrincham, before playing in the Football League with Crewe Alexandra, Coventry City, Wolverhampton Wanderers, West Bromwich Albion and Bury. Edwards then returned to non-League football with Hednesford Town.

Following his time at Crewe—where he played 108 games, scoring seven goals—he was named in the 1989-1990 Third Division PFA Team of the Year, the first Crewe player to feature in the awards. In March 1990, he was sold to Coventry City for £350,000.

Honours
Individual
PFA Team of the Year: 1989–90 Third Division

References

External links
 
 

1963 births
Living people
English footballers
Altrincham F.C. players
Crewe Alexandra F.C. players
Coventry City F.C. players
Wolverhampton Wanderers F.C. players
West Bromwich Albion F.C. players
Bury F.C. players
Hednesford Town F.C. players
English Football League players
Sportspeople from Birkenhead
Association football defenders